Gleb Rovdo (born 4 June 2002) is a Belarusian professional footballer who plays for Isloch Minsk Raion.

References

External links 
 
 

2002 births
Living people
Belarusian footballers
Association football midfielders
FC Dinamo Minsk players
FC Isloch Minsk Raion players